Giorgi Khidesheli (born 23 January 1988) is a Georgian professional football player.

External links
 

1988 births
Living people
Footballers from Georgia (country)
Association football defenders
Georgia (country) international footballers
Georgia (country) under-21 international footballers
Erovnuli Liga players
FC Tbilisi players
FC Zestafoni players
FC Kakheti Telavi players
FC Torpedo Kutaisi players
FC Dinamo Tbilisi players